The Hyde Park Central School District is a public school district located in Hyde Park, New York. The district enrollment is estimated at 4,200 students at the end of the 2014/15 school year. in six schools in grades K–12. The district superintendent is Greer F. Fischer, Ed.D. The seventh school in the district was Hyde Park Elementary School. However, due to declining student enrollment in the district, the school was closed after the end of the 2011/12 school year, despite protests from other citizens. That school is currently used for the pupil personnel services; those offices moved into the building in December 2012.

Schools

Elementary schools
Netherwood Elementary School
North Park Elementary School
Ralph R. Smith Elementary School
Violet Avenue Elementary School

Middle school
Haviland Middle School

High school
 Franklin D. Roosevelt High School

References

Hyde Park, New York
School districts in New York (state)
Education in Dutchess County, New York